Ryan Nyquist (born March 6, 1979) is an American professional BMX rider with 16 X-Games medals, 39 X-Games competition starts and 60 Dew Tour finals appearances (most all-time). Nyquist is considered one of the greatest and diversely skilled BMX riders ever. Nyquist has won numerous gold medals in the X Games Dirt Jumping & Bike Park events. Recently Nyquist has had an interest in freeride mountain biking and has been training in mountain biking as well as BMX. He currently rides for Haro Bikes, Vans Shoes, Rockstar Energy Drink, and The Jiffy Market of Los Gatos.

Personal
After living in Greenville, North Carolina for a period, Nyquist returned to the San Jose, California area where he lives with his wife and sons.

Career
Nyquist has been professional since 1995 and first competed in the X Games in 1996. He is known as one of the best contest riders in the history of BMX. He has been a regular top finisher for over fifteen years. He's also known for doing groundbreaking barspin variations. In 2006 he performed in Cirque Rocks, a charity circus held in New Zealand In 2015 Nyquist expressed interest in Slopestyle Mountain Biking. In 2016 he trained to make his way to Crankworx later qualifying at a spot at Red Bull Joyride, placing top 10 at 9 out of the 18 riders. He also became the first rider to ride with pegs on a Mountain Bike during an event. In Nyquist offseason of BMX, he competes in Freeride Slopestyle mountain biking and quickly became one of the top mountain bike competitors finishing as high as 3rd Bronze Medal in slopestyle mountain bike premier Red Bull Joy Ride event in 2017, In 2017 he would place 4th overall in the coveted FMB Diamond Series. While the last few years he's focused on mountain biking, he planned to rededicate and return to park riding qualifying for the inaugural 2020 Tokyo Summer Olympics. In September 2019, it was announced that he would be the first Head Coach of Team USA Olympic's first BMX Freestyle.

Awards

2002
X Games - Park Champion

2003
Triple Crown of BMX - Park Champion
Triple Crown of BMX - Dirt Champion

2004
ESPY - Best Action Sports

2007
AST Dew Tour BMX Dirt Dew Cup Champion

2009
AST Dew Tour BMX Dirt Dew Cup Champion

2012
Gold Medal - Grand Palais BMX Contest - Red Bull Skyline

2013
AST Dew Tour BMX Park Dew Cup Champion

2014
1st Place - Red Bull Dreamline 2014

2017
3rd Place - Red Bull Joy Ride, Whistler 2017

2018
2nd Place - Wipperfürt BMX Contest 2018
1st place tie with Pat "the cat" Skate Cary Competition 2018

Other
In 2003, Nyquist played himself on an episode of The Jersey called "The New Kid in Town" where he switches bodies with a boy named Elliott Rifkin (played by Theo Greenway) as he has to spend the afternoon with a new kid at school who has a chip on his shoulder.

Nyquist was featured on MTV Cribs and made a guest appearance as himself on the cartoon Kim Possible.

References

External links
Official website
Biography at expn.com
Photographs of Los Gatos event at which Nyquist performed

1979 births
American male cyclists
BMX riders
Living people
People from Los Gatos, California
X Games athletes
Sportspeople from Greenville, North Carolina
Cyclists from California
Cyclists from North Carolina